James Thorne Smith, Jr. (March 27, 1892 – June 20, 1934) was an American writer of humorous supernatural fantasy fiction under the byline Thorne Smith. He is best known today for the two Topper novels, comic fantasy fiction involving sex, much drinking and ghosts. With racy illustrations, these sold millions of copies in the 1930s and were equally popular in paperbacks of the 1950s.

Smith was born in Annapolis, Maryland, the son of a Navy commodore, and attended Dartmouth College. Following hungry years in Greenwich Village, working part-time as an advertising agent, Smith achieved meteoric success with the publication of Topper in 1926. He was an early resident of Free Acres, a social experimental community developed by Bolton Hall according to the economic principles of Henry George, in Berkeley Heights, New Jersey. He died of a heart attack in 1934 while vacationing in Florida.

Works
 Biltmore Oswald: The Diary of a Hapless Recruit (1918). A series of comic stories written for the Naval Reserve journal The Broadside while Smith was in the Navy.
 Out O' Luck: Biltmore Oswald Very Much at Sea (1919).
 Haunts and Bypaths (1919). A book of poetry.
 Topper (1926, copyright renewed 1953—also known as The Jovial Ghosts). This and its sequel, Topper Takes a Trip (1932, set in the French Riviera), are probably Smith's most famous work, about a respectable banker called Cosmo Topper, married to his depressingly staid wife Mary, and his misadventures with a couple of ghosts, Marion and George Kerby, who introduce him to other ghosts.  He is romantically attracted to Marion, who at one point tries to kill him so that they can always be together.  Unusually for such a book, Mary is treated sympathetically—she does not like what she has become and tries to change. 
 Topper was made into a 1937 film starring Cary Grant as George Kerby, Constance Bennett as Marion Kerby, and Roland Young as Cosmo Topper. Two filmed sequels followed: Topper Takes a Trip, in 1939, and Topper Returns, in 1941.  The latter film was not based on a book. Young reprised the role in the 1945 NBC radio summer replacement series The Adventures of Topper. The books were adapted into an American television series, Topper, beginning in 1953, with Leo G. Carroll as Cosmo Topper, and Robert Sterling and Anne Jeffreys as the ghosts. Seventy-eight episodes were made.  The pilot episode and a few of the early episodes were written by Stephen Sondheim.
 Dream's End (1927, copyright renewed 1955). A serious novel that was not a success.
 The Stray Lamb (1929). Mild-mannered investment banker, cuckold, and dipsomaniac T. Lawrence Lamb gains perspective on the human condition during a series of mysterious transformations into various animal forms. Lamb, his daughter Hebe, her boyfriend Melville Long, and Hebe's friend Sandra Rush (a twentyish lingerie model who becomes Lamb's love interest) pursue many adventures, most of which fall well outside the perimeter of law and order. Lamb has, like many Thorne Smith heroes, a shrewish (and in this case adulterous) wife who at one point tries to murder him (at the time he is a goldfish). As in many Thorne Smith novels, a courtroom scene involving the protagonists and an exasperated judge provides a climax to the characteristically tipsy action. This novel is included with Turnabout and Rain in the Doorway in The Thorne Smith 3-Decker (Sun Dial Press, 1933).
 Did She Fall? (1930). A mystery novel admired by Dashiell Hammett.
 The Night Life of the Gods (1931). Quirky inventor Hunter Hawk strikes gold when he invents a device enabling him to turn living matter into stone and to reverse the process at will. After a chaotic field test he meets stunning 900-year-old Megaera, who teaches him to turn stone into flesh. They and some friends set their sights on New York City to bring the Roman gods of the Metropolitan Museum of Art to life: Mercury shows himself an expert pickpocket, while Neptune causes chaos in the fish market.
 Turnabout (1931) pits two modern married people into a battle of the sexes.  Noticing the bickering and jealousy of a young man and wife, an Egyptian idol causes them to switch bodies. Tim Willows works in an advertising agency, and several of the scenes draw on author Thorne Smith's experience.  After his wife, Sally, impregnates her husband, things take a decided turn for the worse as they separately try to deal with the object of the former wife's affections—a square-jawed philanderer by the name of Carl Bently.  The scene in which Tim, trapped in his wife's body, exacts an icy revenge on the unfortunate interloper is one of the unforgettable moments of Thorne Smith's peculiar humor. Both a film (1940) and a short-lived 1979 television sitcom starring Sharon Gless and John Schuck (canceled after six episodes) were based on Turnabout, as to some extent was the last broadcast episode of Star Trek: The Original Series, "Turnabout Intruder". This novel is included with The Stray Lamb and Rain in the Doorway in The Thorne Smith 3-Decker.
 Lazy Bear Lane (1931). A children's book.
 The Bishop's Jaegers (1932). The depressed, indifferent heir of a vast coffee import fortune, Peter Van Dyke finds his life and high society engagement turned upside down when his secretary, Josephine Duval, determines to “rescue” him by ruining him morally.  After an amusing scandal in a coat closet, he is cast adrift in a fog with a motley crew that includes a bishop of the Episcopal Church and a former nude model named Aspirin Liz.  The enterprising party lands unceremoniously on the shores of a naturist resort, and the liberation of the coffee importer is set in motion. Smith, in one of his few comic novels devoid of any element of the supernatural, assumes the reader would know that "Jaegers" refers to a union suit.
 Rain in the Doorway (1933). A cuckold husband, Hector Owen, inadvertently becomes a partner in a big-city department store. The bulk of the action involves the inebriated adventures of Owen, his three partners (Mr. Horace Larkin, a man called Dinner, and Major Barney Britt-Britt), and a salesgirl from the pornographic books department, Miss Honor "Satin" Knightly. Of the three novels included in The Thorne Smith 3-Decker (see The Stray Lamb and Turnabout above) this is the most openly erotic, with many direct suggestions of sexual encounters, accompanied with cartoons of nude women cavorting with the protagonists, drawn by artist Herbert Roese.  The Thorne Smith courtroom scene provides a climax, but the novel's biggest surprise isn't sprung until the final pages.
 Skin and Bones (1933). A photographer's freak accident in the darkroom produces a chemical concoction causing him and his dog to randomly switch back and forth between normal and X-ray (skeleton) versions of themselves.  Drinking and cavorting ensues as he finds people able to see beyond his appearance and appreciate him for who he is, while inadvertently terrifying those who cannot.  Unusually, his wife Lorna is an attractive personality.
 The Glorious Pool (1934). Perhaps the best example of Thorne Smith's acutely sharp social humor played out against a backdrop of the Volstead Act (Prohibition).  Two unrepentant reprobates are celebrating the 25th anniversary of the seduction which made the stylish Rex Pebble into an adulterer and his companion, Spray Summers, into his hard-boiled mistress.  While their exasperating and alcoholic Japanese houseboy, Nakashima, plays jujitsu with the English language, the two slip into a swimming pool, the waters of which have been changed into a fountain of youth.  Abandoning their clothes and modesty with their advanced years, the newfound youthfulness of their bodies puts into motion an evening of hijinks that only a seasoned and well-practiced couple of sinners could imagine.
 The Passionate Witch (1941, published posthumously and completed by Norman H. Matson). Produced in 1942 as the film I Married a Witch, this novel was one of the inspirations, along with Bell, Book and Candle, for the long-running TV series Bewitched. A sequel to the novel, Bats in the Belfry (1942), is entirely by Matson, though sometimes attributed to Smith.

Skin and Bones, Turnabout, The Night Life of the Gods, The Passionate Witch, The Stray Lamb, The Bishop's Jaegers, The Glorious Pool, and Rain in the Doorway were all published by Armed Services Editions.

References

Further reading

Dissertations
 Joseph Leo Blotner, Thorne Smith: A Study in Popular Fiction (1951 dissertation, 197 pages with bibliography and appendices)
 Howard Steven Jitomer, Forgotten Excellence: A Study of Thorne Smith's Humor (1983 dissertation, 224 pages with bibliography)
 Peter Zilahy Ingerman, The World in Thorne Smith (1991 dissertation, 323 pages including appendices)

Biographies 
 Roland Young & Thorne Smith, Thorne Smith: His Life and Times (1934, Doubleday, Doran & Company, New York, 32p.)
 Anthony Slide, A Man named Smith -- The novels and screen legacy of Thorne Smith (2015, Albany, GA, 174p.)

Bibliographies and checklists
 Haas, Irvin, comp. "[James] Thorne Smith [Jr.] 1893–1934." (American First Editions. Edited by Jacob Blanck.) The Publishers’ Weekly, 130 (28 November 1936): 2134.
 Sprague, Don. "Thorne Smith." Collecting Paperbacks? 3, no. 2 (May 1981), 19.
 Valone, Philip J., Jr. A Thorne Smith Source Book. N.p.: The author, 1982.
 Bleiler, E. F. The Guide to Supernatural Fiction. Kent, Ohio: Kent State University Press, [1983], pp. 464–66.
 Scheetz, George H., and Rodney N. Henshaw. "Thorne Smith." Bulletin of Bibliography, 41, no. 1 (March 1984): 25–37. Illustrated.
 [Ahearn, Patricia, and Allen Ahearn.] "Thorne Smith." Author Price Guide, No. [069], June 1986. 3 pp. Published by Quill & Brush; P. O. Box 5365; Rockville, Md. [Based on Scheetz, q.v.; credited.]
 [Smiley, Kathryn]. "A Thorne Smith Checklist." Firsts: Collecting Modern First Editions, 3, no. 4 (April 1993): 19. Illustrated.

External links
 The Official Thorne Smith Website by Michael D. Walker
 Biography at Thorne Smith: Haunts & By-Paths

Libraries
 
 Joseph Blotner collection on Thorne Smith, Kislak Center for Special Collections, Rare Books and Manuscripts, University of Pennsylvania

Online editions
 LibraryThing author profile
 
 
 
 
 Thorne Smith, The Online Books Page, University of Pennsylvania
 Archive of Thorne Smith novels which are out of European copyright

1892 births
1934 deaths
20th-century American male writers
20th-century American novelists
20th-century American short story writers
American fantasy writers
American humorists
American male novelists
American male short story writers
Dartmouth College alumni
Novelists from Maryland
Novelists from New Jersey
People from Berkeley Heights, New Jersey
Writers from Annapolis, Maryland